What's Up, Scarlet? is a 2005 American romantic comedy-drama film directed by Anthony Caldarella and starring Susan Priver, Musetta Vander, Sally Kirkland and Jere Burns.

Cast
Susan Priver as Scarlet Zabrinski
Musetta Vander as Sabrina Fisser
Sally Kirkland as Ruth Zabrinski
Jere Burns as Ben Zabrinski
Carmen Argenziano as Mr. Maggiami

References

External links
 
 

2005 romantic comedy-drama films
2005 films
American romantic comedy-drama films
2000s English-language films
2000s American films